Flower differentiation is a plant process by which the shoot apical meristem changes its anatomy to generate a flower or inflorescence in lieu of other structures. Anatomical changes begin at the edge of the meristem, generating first the outer whorls of the flower - the calyx and the corolla, and later the inner whorls of the flower, the androecium and gynoecium.

Flower differentiation can take from only a few days (in annual plants) to 4–11 months (in fruit crops).

The process is preceded by flower induction.

Morphological Characteristics:[edit] 
Flower bud differentiation was seen to have five different stages in the flower M.sinostellata.

Undifferentiated stage: The flower bud was seen as yellow-green, had no scale hairs and was smooth outside. Its differentiation primordium cells are small and arranged closely.

Early flower bud differentiation stage: The bud's basal region begins to expand and develops yellow-brown hairs on its outer surface. The bracts inside the growing bud begin to stratify. Cells are still closely arranged and the floral primordium becomes larger.

Petal primordium differentiation stage: At this stage, the bud becomes more distinct than the leaf primordia by becoming longer and wider. The bud develops a couple of spathe-like bracts with scale hairs. The start of petal primordium differentiation is demonstrated by the wave-like surface of the tip of the developing floral meristem.

Stamen primordium differentiation stage: The bud has expanded and the outer hairs mentioned earlier have become denser. The inner buds differentiation region forms a rounded hump shape with a smooth tip. The bud meristem inner cells are separate from each other while the outer cells stay small and compact. Rows of small spots were found on the inside of the petal primordia around the bottom of the meristem.

Pistil primordium differentiation stage: The pistil primordia beginning to differentiate is indicated by the multiple round bulges in the upper region of the meristem. During this stage, the bud continues to increase its volume. While the Bud tip continues elongating, its base becomes thick and its top turns into a conical shape. Morphological characteristics of the five differentiation stages in Magnolia sinostellata.
Fully developed flower bud: Completed differentiation with the bulges from the last step retained.

References 

Plant physiology